The Scoresby Hills, also called the Scoresby Mountains, are a mountain range on the east coast of Bathurst Island, Nunavut, Canada. It consists of low hills which in turn form part of the Arctic Cordillera mountain system.

See also
List of mountain ranges

References

Mountain ranges of Qikiqtaaluk Region
Arctic Cordillera